Gandia Bàsquet Athletic is a professional basketball team based in Gandia, Valencian Community and plays in the Municipal de Gandia, in Liga EBA.

In 2013, the club was dissolved and loaned its rights to the new creation club in the city called Units pel Bàsquet Gandia.

Season by season

References

External links 
 Federación Española de Baloncesto
 Official Gandia Bàsquet page

Defunct basketball teams in Spain
Former LEB Oro teams
Basketball teams in the Valencian Community
Basketball teams established in 1981
Liga EBA teams
Basketball teams disestablished in 2013
Province of Valencia